André Caquot (24 April 1923 – 1 September 2004) was a French orientalist, specialized in Semitic history and civilisations and professor of Hebrew and Aramaic language at the Collège de France. In 1986, André Caquot was elected president of the Académie des Inscriptions et Belles-Lettres. His work particularly focused on the Dead Sea Scrolls, Ugaritic and Phoenician sculptures, as well as on ancient Ethiopia.

Career 
A former student of the École Normale Supérieure in Paris, agrégé de grammaire, André Caquot 

From 1964 to 1968, he was responsible for Hebrew lessons and history of the religion of Israel at the Sorbonne, then from 1972 to 1994, he occupied the chair of Hebrew and Aramaic at the Collège de France. Elected a member of the Académie des inscriptions et belles-lettres in 1977, he became president of the institution in 1986. In 1992, he was president of the 14th congress of the International Organisation for the Study of the Old Testament.

He contributed to the translation of the Psalms and the Books of Samuel for the Traduction œcuménique de la Bible.

References

Bibliography 
 Philipe de Robert, « André Caquot », in Patrick Cabanel and André Encrevé (dir.), Dictionnaire biographique des protestants français de 1787 à nos jours, tome 1 : A-C, Les Éditions de Paris Max Chaleil, Paris, 2015,  (p. 562–563)

External links 
 CAQUOT André, Marcel on the site of the Académie des Inscriptions et Belle-Lettres
 Une religion qui incarne l’esprit national by André Caquot in Le Monde diplomatique

French Hebraists
French orientalists
French philologists
Translators of the Bible into French
French historians of religion
Historians of Jews and Judaism
École Normale Supérieure alumni
Academic staff of the École pratique des hautes études
Academic staff of the University of Paris
Academic staff of the University of Strasbourg
Academic staff of the Collège de France
Members of the Académie des Inscriptions et Belles-Lettres
Members of the Société Asiatique
Chevaliers of the Légion d'honneur
Commanders of the Ordre national du Mérite
Commandeurs of the Ordre des Palmes Académiques
People from Épinal
1923 births
2004 deaths
20th-century translators
20th-century philologists
Translators from Mandaic